Okoye is a fictional character and the General of the Dora Milaje in Marvel Comics. The character, created by Christopher Priest and Mark Texeira, first appeared in Black Panther (vol. 3) #1 (November 1998) within the comics.

Danai Gurira portrays the character in the Marvel Cinematic Universe films Black Panther (2018), Avengers: Infinity War (2018), Avengers: Endgame (2019), Black Panther: Wakanda Forever (2022), and the Disney+ animated series What If...? (2021) in alternate timelines.

Publication history
Okoye first appeared in Black Panther (vol. 3) #1 (November 1998). She last appeared in Black Panther (vol. 3) #62 in 2003 until returning in Black Panther #171 (2018).

Fictional character biography
She joined alongside her friend Nakia to be among T'Challa's wives-in-training. However, when Okoye discovered that T'Challa had no interest in marrying either of them, she immediately came to accept this. She has since stood at T'Challa's side. Okoye accompanied T'Challa when he recruited Queen Divine Justice. She was also with T'Challa when they tested Kasper Cole on whether he was worthy of the Black Panther garb. Okoye herself tested Kasper if he would stay with his pregnant girlfriend or leave her for Okoye.

Okoye later appears as the director of the Agents of Wakanda.

During the "Empyre" storyline, Okoye is among those that help to deal with the Cotati invasion. While on the Wakandan Helicarrier, she detects plant-based activity in Antarctica as Ka-Zar states that the Savage Land is there. She later assists Thing, Shuri, and the Agents of Wakanda in fighting the Cotati who have breached Wakanda's forcefield.

Skills and abilities
Okoye is highly skilled in multiple forms of combat, and the leader (and General) of the Dora Milaje. She is exceptional in using various Wakandan weaponry and tools, especially skilled in the use of spears. Okoye is a great tactician and military strategist.

In other media

Television
 Okoye makes a non-speaking cameo appearance in The Avengers: Earth's Mightiest Heroes episode "Welcome to Wakanda".
 Okoye appears in Lego Marvel Super Heroes - Black Panther: Trouble in Wakanda, voiced by Yvette Nicole Brown.

Marvel Cinematic Universe

Danai Gurira portrays Okoye in media set in the Marvel Cinematic Universe. This version is a general of the Dora Milaje with the utmost respect for T'Challa and Wakanda and is the wife of W'Kabi.
 In the live-action film Black Panther, she works with T'Challa to capture Ulysses Klaue. However, when Erik "Killmonger" Stevens seemingly kills T'Challa in a trial by combat for Wakanda's throne, Okoye and the Dora Milaje are forced to serve him due to their loyalty to the throne. When T'Challa returns alive and Killmonger refuses to abide by the trial's rules, Okoye leads the Dora Milaje in helping T'Challa overthrow Killmonger.
 In the live-action film Avengers: Infinity War, Okoye joins the Wakandans and the Avengers in fighting Thanos' forces. While she survives the Blip, she is horrified to witness T'Challa and half of the Wakandans fall victim to it.
 In the live-action film Avengers: Endgame, Okoye begins working with the Avengers through Natasha Romanoff, reporting directly to her and monitoring issues in Wakanda. After the Avengers undo the Blip, Okoye and the revived Wakandans join them in fighting an alternate timeline version of Thanos and later attends Tony Stark’s funeral. 
 Alternate timeline versions of Okoye appears in the Disney+ animated series What If...?.
 In the live-action film Black Panther: Wakanda Forever, Okoye joins Shuri in finding Riri Williams after Namor threatens Wakanda, but is defeated by his forces and stripped of her rank. Despite this, Okoye continues to defend Wakanda and later receives the "Midnight Angel" armor from Shuri to defeat Attuma in combat and rescue Everett K. Ross. 
 Okoye will return in an untitled Wakanda series.

Video games
 Okoye appears in Lego Marvel Super Heroes 2 as part of the "Black Panther" DLC.
 Okoye appears in Marvel Avengers Academy, voiced by Bindy Cody.
 Okoye appears as a playable character in Marvel Puzzle Quest and Marvel Strike Force.

Miscellaneous
 Okoye appears in the table top miniatures game HeroClix.
 Okoye appears in the table top game Marvel Crisis Protocol.

References

External links 
 

Black characters in films
Characters created by Christopher Priest
Comics characters introduced in 1998
Wakandans
Marvel Comics martial artists
Fictional military strategists
Fictional women soldiers and warriors
Marvel Comics female superheroes
Marvel Comics military personnel